The 1990–91 Segunda Divisão de Honra season was the first season of the competition and the 57th season of recognised second-tier football in Portugal.

Overview
The league was contested by 20 teams with Paços de Ferreira winning the championship and gaining promotion to the Primeira Diviasão along with Estoril Praia and Torreense. At the other end of the table O Elvas, Freamunde, Varzim, Maia, Águeda, Lusitano VRSA and Barreirense were relegated to the Segunda Divisão.

League table

Footnotes

External links
 Portugal 1990/91 - RSSSF (Paulo Claro)
 Portuguese II Liga 1990/1991 - footballzz.co.uk

Portuguese Second Division seasons
Port
2